Princess Fadzilah Lubabul Bolkiah  (born 23 August 1985) is a princess of Brunei. She is the ninth child of Sultan Hassanal Bolkiah of Brunei by his former second wife, Hajah Mariam. She has been nicknamed Fad by her teammates in the netball national team and sometimes referred to as the Sporty Princess by the media.

Education 
In 2008, Princess Fadzilah graduated from Kingston University, London, and would later achieved her master's degree from Hult International Business School, Massachusetts.

Sports career 
As the national team's official prior to the 29th Southeast Asian (SEA) Games in Kuala Lumpur, she praised the efforts put into preparations and progress. Fad made her national team debut as a WA in the 2018 Asian Netball Championship, where the team concluded the tournament in the 8th place. On 14 April 2019, she and Rocketeers team emerged champions of the President’s Cup Netball Tournament held at the Multi-Purpose Hall of the Hassanal Bolkiah National Sports Complex.

She captained the national netball team and took part in the 2019 Southeast Asian Games which was held in Laguna, Philippines. They returned from the tournament with bronze medals with Prince Sufri Bolkiah as the awardee. After the team's bronze win, she alongside her team received cash incentive through the government’s Sports Excellence Incentive Scheme.

Personal life 
Princess Fadzilah regularly attends public and private celebrations around the country. She also has interests in polo and became an equestrian. Her siblings included Prince Azim, Princess Azemah and Prince Mateen. She married Abdullah Nabil Mahmoud Al-Hashimi on 16 January 2022, which was marked by a 10-day royal wedding celebration at Istana Nurul Iman.

Legacy

Namesakes 
 Pengiran Anak Puteri Fadzilah Lubabul Bolkiah Religious School, a religious school in Kampong Kupang.

Honours 

  Royal Family Order of the Crown of Brunei (DKMB)

References

1985 births
Living people
Bruneian people of Arab descent
Bruneian people of Japanese descent
Bruneian people of English descent
Bruneian royalty
Bruneian polo players
Bruneian netball players